Wanaque may refer to:

Wanaque, New Jersey, a borough in Passaic County, New Jersey
Wanaque River, a tributary of the Pequannock River in Passaic County, New Jersey
Wanaque Reservoir, formed by damming the river